Grahame Stuart Thorne (born 25 February 1946) is a former All Black rugby player, rugby union commentator, Member of Parliament and municipal councillor and TV cooking show host. He was born in Auckland, New Zealand.

Rugby union
A centre, wing, and second five-eighth, Thorne represented Auckland at a provincial level, and was a member of the New Zealand national side, the All Blacks, from 1967 to 1970. He played 39 matches for the All Blacks including 10 internationals. In 2014, he featured on a list of the top 100 All Blacks.
While in Auckland, Thorne initially played for the Auckland University Rugby Club and later for the Pakuranga United Club.

Grahame's sons Bruce and David also played rugby union; Bruce played in South Africa for Transvaal and the Junior Springboks, and David played club rugby in Nelson, New Zealand.

Sports broadcasting career

After his playing career, Thorne worked as a sports commentator for Television New Zealand, often appearing alongside Keith Quinn.

Member of Parliament

Thorne was the National Party Member of Parliament for Onehunga in the 43rd parliament from the 1990 election to 1993. The seat had been held by Labour since the 1938 election.

Local government

After his parliamentary career Thorne held local government roles as an elected councillor of Onehunga Borough Council, Auckland City Council, Auckland Regional Council, Nelson City Council (2004); was an unsuccessful candidate for Christchurch City Council in 2007 then was an unsuccessful candidate for Queenstown Lakes District Council in 2010. Thorne described his unsuccessful Christchurch candidacy as due to "not thinking clearly at the time" but that he had generally "given [his] best when elected to public office."

Cooking shows
Thorne has had two cooking shows on New Zealand TV; Thorney's Cooking Canterbury and Thorney's Cooking Central, both produced by his son Gareth.

Personal life
Thorne was adopted at birth in an adoption privately arranged by his grandfather. He described learning of his adoption at age 21 as "a devastating experience." He has married twice, with one son born to his first (South African) wife and four children to his second (New Zealand) wife.

Thorne's family life was beset by tragedy. His son David had a spinal injury and stroke following a hard rugby tackle in a club rugby game in Nelson in 2006, and underwent long recuperation at Burwood Hospital. The care of his son distracted Thorne from his local government duties and he was criticised for refusing to resign.

Son Bruce died when his four wheel drive vehicle overturned near Bloemfontein in South Africa in December 2009. Thorne struggled with grief and alcohol consumption following the accident.

References

1946 births
Living people
Rugby union players from Auckland
People educated at Auckland Grammar School
New Zealand rugby union players
New Zealand international rugby union players
Auckland rugby union players
Rugby union centres
Sharks (Currie Cup) players
Blue Bulls players
New Zealand National Party MPs
New Zealand MPs for Auckland electorates
New Zealand sportsperson-politicians
Members of the New Zealand House of Representatives
Unsuccessful candidates in the 1993 New Zealand general election
Auckland City Councillors
Auckland regional councillors